This is a list of Pakistani films that are scheduled to be released in 2022. For foreign films of 2022 release in Pakistan, See List of 2022 box office number-one films in Pakistan.

Box Office Collection

The top ten highest-grossing Pakistani films released in 2022, by worldwide box office gross revenue, are as follows.

Background color  indicates the current releases

January–March

April–June

July–September

October–December

See also 

 List of 2022 box office number-one films in Pakistan
 List of highest-grossing Pakistani films
 List of highest-grossing films in Pakistan
 Lists of Pakistani films

References

External links

2022
Pakistan